Dr. A.P.J. Abdul Kalam Government College, also known as Newtown Government College, established in 2014, is a government degree college in New Town, Kolkata, India offering undergraduate courses in arts and science. It is affiliated to West Bengal State University.

Departments

Arts
Bengali
English
History
Philosophy
Political Science
Sociology

Science

Chemistry
Botany
Zoology
Anthropology
Psychology

See also
Education in India
List of colleges in West Bengal
Education in West Bengal

References

External links

Universities and colleges in North 24 Parganas district
Colleges affiliated to West Bengal State University
Educational institutions established in 2015
2015 establishments in West Bengal
Memorials to A. P. J. Abdul Kalam